The following is a list of types of dessert cakes by country of origin and distinctive ingredients. The majority of the cakes contain some kind of flour, egg, and sugar. Cake is often served as a celebratory dish on ceremonial occasions such as weddings, anniversaries, and birthdays.



Cakes

See also

 List of baked goods
 List of breads
 List of buns
 List of desserts
 List of pancakes
 List of pastries
 List of pies, tarts and flans
 Pop out cake
 Rice cake

References

Cakes
Cakes
Cakes